The Association of University Staff of New Zealand (AUS) was a national trade union in New Zealand. At its peak, it represented 6500 workers employed in New Zealand universities. In 2009 it merged with the Association of Staff in Tertiary Education to form the New Zealand Tertiary Education Union.

The AUS was formed 1 July 1991 in a merger between the Association of University Teachers of New Zealand (AUTNZ) and the New Zealand University Technicians Union (NZUTU).

The AUS was a member of the New Zealand Council of Trade Unions, as well as Education International.

External links
 AUS official site.

New Zealand Council of Trade Unions
Education International
Trade unions in New Zealand
Trade unions established in 1991
1991 establishments in New Zealand
Trade unions disestablished in 2009